Burak Erman Yörük (born 26 May 1995) is a Turkish film and television actor.

Personal life

His maternal family is of Albanian descent. He began acting as child actor. He studied theatre department in Beykent University. His family works in  tv-media industry. His father was producer.

Private life 
Burak Yörük has been dating with Tuana Yılmaz, who is a designer and singer, since 2021. His previous girlfriends were the actress Alina Boz, model Elif Aksu, and the one before Sibil Çetinkaya is a social media influencer.

Career 
Yörük made his debut on television with a role in the series Sırlar Dünyası in 2002 as child actor. He subsequently appeared in Biz Boşanıyoruz, Şeytan, Dede Korkut Hikâyeleri and Perde before being cast in 20 Dakika and Ben Onu Çok Sevdim as Aydın Menderes in 2013.

In 2017, he joined in series Dayan Yüreğim. He further rose to prominence with his role as Barış Ozansoy in 4N1K İlk Aşk (2018) and its sequel series 4N1K Yeni Başlangıçlar (2019) and 4N1K movies (2017)(2018) which adaptation of the novel. His breakthrough came with a leading role in the 2020 series Baraj which was made into a film in 1977, alongside Tarık Akan and Türkan Şoray. The following year he began starring in the romantic comedy TV series Aşk Mantık İntikam.

Filmography

Television 
 2002 – Sırlar Dünyası
 2004 – Biz Boşanıyoruz (Cancan)
 2005 – Şeytan
 2007 – Dede Korkut Hikâyeleri (Salur Kazan)
 2013 – 20 Dakika (Tayfur Solmaz)
 2013 – Ben Onu Çok Sevdim (Aydın Menderes)
 2017 – Dayan Yüreğim (Erdem)
 2018 – 4N1K İlk Aşk (Barış Ozansoy)
 2019 – 4N1K Yeni Başlangıçlar (Barış Ozansoy)
 2020–2021 – Baraj (Tarık Yılmaz)
 2021–2022 –Aşk Mantık İntikam (Çınar Yılmaz)
 2022 – Seversin (Tolga Tuna)

Film 
 2005 – Perde
 2017 – 4N1K (Barış Ozansoy)
 2018 – 4N1K 2 (Barış Ozansoy)

Music videos 
 2019 – Baran Bayraktar – "Yine"
 2019 – Zeynep Bastık & Anıl Piyancı – "Bırakman Doğru mu?"
 2019 – Reynmen – "Ela"
 2020 – Zeynep Bastık – "Her Mevsim Yazım"

References

External links 
 
 
 

1995 births
Living people
Turkish male film actors
Turkish male television actors
Male actors from Istanbul
21st-century Turkish male actors